1997 Malian parliamentary election may refer to:

April 1997 Malian parliamentary election
July 1997 Malian parliamentary election